The PZL-106 Kruk is a Polish agricultural aircraft designed and built by WSK PZL Warszawa-Okęcie (later PZL "Warszawa-Okęcie" and now EADS-PZL).

Design and development
The PZL-106 was developed as a modern agricultural aircraft for Poland and Comecon countries to replace the less-capable PZL-101 Gawron and aging PZL Antonov An-2. (According to Comecon decisions, Polish industry was responsible for developing agricultural aircraft). There were several agricultural plane designs proposed in the early 1960s by a group of young designers from WSK PZL Warszawa-Okęcie, led by Andrzej Frydrychewicz. These proposals were made on their own initiative, but they were never realized because the USSR was content with the An-2 and was planning to replace it with a jet aircraft (later PZL M-15 Belphegor). The first was the PZL-101M Kruk 63 of 1963. That remained a paper airplane, but it did give its name to later designs. Next were the PZL-106 Kruk 65 (1965), PZL-110 Kruk-2T (1969), and PZL M-14 Kruk (1970, which was planned to produce this variant in PZL-Mielec). Only in 1971 did the authorities decide to start development of new agricultural design such as the PZL-106 Kruk 71. Despite this decision, its development was quite protracted due to economic and political factors. The work, led by Andrzej Frydrychewicz, started in 1972 and was based on earlier designs. The first prototype was flown on April 17, 1973. The designers chose a safe layout of a braced low-wing monoplane with a container for chemicals in front of the pilot, a design inspired by planes like Piper PA-25 Pawnee (in case of an emergency landing, the container would not crush the higher-sitting pilot).

The first prototype was powered by an imported 298 kW (400 hp) Lycoming IO-720 flat-eight-cylinder engine and had a T-tail with wings of wooden construction. There were several prototypes built, and the plane was finally fitted with a 441 kW (600 hp) PZL-3S radial engine, a conventional tail and metal wings. The prototype with the final engine first flew on 25 October, 1974.

Production started in 1976 under the designation PZL-106A. Successive variants were the PZL-106AR, with PZL-3SR engine, and the PZL-106AS, with a stronger 736 kW ASz-62IR radial engine. By 1982, 144 PZL-106As had been built. Several aircraft were modified in Africa to PZL-106AS standards.

On May 15, 1981, the prototype of an improved variant PZL-106B was flown with redesigned wings using shorter struts. It was powered by the same PZL-3SR engine and was produced from 1984. In 1982, the prototype of the PZL-106BS flew powered by the ASz-62IR engine. By 1988, 60 PZL-106Bs had been built.

The next step was fitting the Kruk with a turboprop engine. The first was the PZL-106AT Turbo Kruk prototype, with a 566 kW (770 hp) Pratt & Whitney PT6A-34AG engine, in 1981. The next version, based upon the PZL-106B, was the PZL-106BT Turbo Kruk with a 544 kW Walter M601D-1 engine. The PZL-106BT first flew in 1985 and was only produced in limited numbers (10 in 1986–1988). The last variant, in 1998, was the PZL-106BTU-34 Turbo Kruk, with a Pratt & Whitney PT6A-34AG engine. Both turboprop variants have a taller tailfin, and the BTU-34 differs again with a restyled nose, a bigger fuel tank (780 L), a revised cockpit layout, and improved performance.

In total, 266 PZL-106s were produced. Production was restarted in 1995, and, as of 2007, the PZL-106BT (renamed PZL-106BT-601) with the Walter M601-D1, and the PZL-106BTU-34, with the PT6A-34AG engine, are currently being offered by the manufacturer EADS-PZL. Limited numbers of turbo-Kruks have been produced so far.

Description
The  PZL-106 is a metal construction braced low-wing monoplane that is conventional in layout. The fuselage is a steel frame covered with duralumin front and canvas tail. Wings are duralumin and canvas covered, fitted with flaps and slats. It has a single-seat cabin, placed high, with an emergency seat for a mechanic behind the pilot. Behind the engine is a 1300-litre container for 1050 kg of chemicals, with interchangeable equipment sets for spraying, cropdusting or fire-fighting. The container might be replaced with an additional cab for an instructor for pilot training. It has conventional fixed landing gear with a tail wheel.

The PZL-106 has a single radial engine PZL-3S or SR (600 hp / 441 kW), four-blade propeller or turboprop engine with three-blade propeller (554 kW Walter M601D-1 or PT6A-34AG). Fuel tanks for 540 L, or from serial number 260 onwards, 760 L.

Operational history
The main user of the PZL-106 was the Polish civilian aviation. At that time, Polish state aviation firms often carried out agricultural services abroad, especially in Egypt and Sudan. They were supplemented and partly superseded by the PZL-Mielec M-18 Dromader. 
PZL-106As and Bs were exported to East Germany (major non-Polish user – 54), Czechoslovakia, Egypt, Hungary, Argentina, Brazil, and Ecuador.  Some PZL-106BT-601s were sold to Egypt, Ecuador (2 Operational till 2008), Argentina (30 operational till 2008), and Brazil (4 operational till 2008). The PZL 106BT-34 is still flying in Argentina.

Variants

PZL-106
Prototypes, first flew on 17 April 1973.
PZL-106A
Basic production variant with  PZL-3S radial engine, produced 1976–1982
PZL-106AR
Prototype with PZL-3SR engine with a reduction gear, first flew on 15 November 1978 
PZL-106AT Turbo Kruk
Prototype with Pratt & Whitney Canada PT6A-34AG turboprop engine, first flew on 22 June 1981 
PZL-106AS
Variant with  PZL ASz-62IR engine, first flew on 19 August 1981 
PZL-106B
Improved production variant with redesigned wings and shorter struts, PZL-3SR engine, first flew on 15 May 1981, produced in 1984–1988 
PZL-106BS
Prototype with PZL ASz-62IR engine, first flew on 8 March 1982 
PZL-106BT-601 Turbo Kruk  
Production variant with  Walter M601D-1 turboprop engine, first flew on 18 September 1985
PZL-106BTU-34 Turbo Kruk
Production variant with  Pratt & Whitney Canada PT6A-34AG turboprop engine, first flew in 1998. Still flying in Argentina

Operators
 With 1 PZL 106BT-601s
 With 30 PZL 106-BT-601 Turbo Kruks and one PZL 106BT-34
 With 4 PZL 106BT-601s
 With 2 PZL 106BT-601s

 received 54 aircraft

 With 2 PZL 106As, entered service in 1977
 One PZL 106 in service with the Venezuelan National Guard.

Specifications (PZL-106BR)

See also

References

Andrzej Glass: Samoloty'85, NOT-SIGMA, Warsaw 1986
Andrzej Glass: Samoloty'90, NOT-SIGMA, Warsaw 1990
Andrzej Glass, Andrzej Frydrychewicz: Problemy rozwoju samolotu PZL-106 Kruk – Polska Technika Lotnicza – Materiały Historyczne 4/2004 – based on a lecture  in Muzeum Techniki, Warsaw 
 Taylor, John W. R. Jane's All The World's Aircraft 1982–83. London:Jane's Yearbooks, 1982. .
 Taylor, John W. R. Jane's All The World's Aircraft 1988–89. Coulsdon, UK:Jane's Defence Data, 1988. .

External links

PZL-106 KRUK website
EADS group website
Airbus Military EADS PZL "Warszawa-Okęcie" website"
PZL-106 KRUK South America on Facebook

PZL aircraft
1970s Polish agricultural aircraft
Single-engined tractor aircraft
Low-wing aircraft
Aircraft first flown in 1973